Nerariyan CBI is a 2005 Indian Malayalam-language mystery film directed and produced by K. Madhu and written by S. N. Swamy. The fourth installment in the franchise of CBI investigative thrillers, Mammootty reprised the role of Sethurama Iyer, a Central Bureau of Investigation officer, with Mukesh and Jagathy Sreekumar reprising their roles as the associate officers Chacko and Vikram respectively and the background score composed by Shyam.

Like its prequels, Oru CBI Diary Kurippu (1988), Jagratha (1989) and Sethurama Iyer CBI (2004), Nerariyan CBI was also set as a murder mystery behind a lady, who found dead at a haunted mansion in suspicious condition.

Plot 
There was a murder in a house. The victim is Mythili. The dead body was seen by Lakshmiyamma first. It was seen that Mythili and her friends along with Anitha came just a day before the murder. And it was also widely said that a room in that bungalow is haunted. Sai, Anitha's fiancé, and a young police officer start to investigate the case but he also starts to believe that the room is haunted because of an incident that happened to him. Soon the case goes to the CBI. It was handled by Sethurama Iyer. Soon he investigates the case and finds out that the room is not haunted and it was a murder and that a few family members of that mansion were involved in the murder of Mythili.

Cast
Mammootty as Sethurama Iyer, SP, CBI
Mukesh as Chacko, DySP, CBI
Jagathy Sreekumar as Vikram, DySP, CBI 
Jishnu Raghavan as ASP Saikumar IPS
Thilakan as Kapra Valiya Narayanan
Mohan Jose as Velu
Gopika as Anitha
Samvrutha Sunil as Mythili
Suja Karthika as Reshmi 
Indrans as Devaswam, caretaker of the mansion 
Cochin Haneefa as George C. Nair / M. C. Nair 
Augustine as DYSP Dhanapalan
P. Sreekumar as Dr. Krishnan Nair
M. R. Gopakumar as Mythili's Father
Rizabawa as Dr. Babu
V. K. Sreeraman as Shankaran
Madhu Warrier as Benjamin C. Nair / Pradeep C. Nair
Balachandran Chullikkadu as Thirumeni
Baburaj as Poopparathy Vasu
Meghanathan as Padmanabhan Achari
Ravi Menon as Krishnan
Anil Murali
Baiju Ezhupunna
Kalabhavan Haneef as Villager
Narayanankutty as Villager
Bindu Ramakrishnan as Lakshmiyamma
Bindu Panicker as Elizabeth C. Nair
Shobha Mohan as Mythili's Mother
Ambika Mohan as Anitha's Kin
Suvarna Mathew as Maya
Seema G. Nair as Thulasi
Jijoy Rajagopal as Richi Nedungadan

Production
The success of the previous film Sethurama Iyer CBI prompted the writer S. N. Swamy and director K. Madhu to join hands again for a one more installment in the series of CBI investigative thrillers. S. N. Swamy completed the screenplay in a time spanning one year. As the plot contained some supernatural themes as well, Swami had to conduct enough research over it. Director K. Madhu, who himself produced Sethurama Iyer CBI, decided to finance Nerariyan CBI too under his banner Krishna Kripa Productions. Madhu, who has collaborated with S. N. Swamy more than 10 films at the time, said, "What thrills us is that teenagers who saw 'CBI Diary Kurippu' are going to see 'Nerariyan' with their kids."

Shyam, who has composed the popular background score for the former films, was again hired for composing the score for the new film, which also lacks songs in its soundtrack. Associate director I. Sasi and production controller Aroma Mohan have remained in the crew from the former team. Saloo George, who was the associate of first two parts of series' cinematographer Vipin Das and has done cinematography in Sethurama Iyer CBI, was signed in to lead the direction of photography in Nerariyan CBI as well. Principal photography began after a discussion on whole screenplay was conducted, that was usual in former films too. Apart from Mammootty, Mukesh and Jagathi Sreekumar who comprised team of CBI investigators, Nedumudi Venu, Thilakan, Samvrutha Sunil, Gopika, Suja Karthika and Jishnu were added to the cast to play other prominent roles in the film. During the on-location filming "the trick of keeping the suspense alive till the end of the film" was difficult, according to Mukesh.

Reception

A critic from Sify assessed the film as "good'" and lauded S.N.Swamy for "making something spectacular out of ordinary material", the "mood enhancing" background score by Shyam, and the "commendable" cinematography of Salu George, noting that "The highlight of the film is Mammootty as the suave and intelligent Sethurama Iyer who looks dashing and debonair. Another
interesting highlight is the war of words
between Iyer and Kapra (Thilakan), a local
sorcerer which ignites the screen." 
The reviewer, however, criticised K. Madhu's "old school of film making" style and "irritating"  frequent in-film ads. The review concludes by saying "On the whole, our two thumbs go up for the
return of Sethurama Iyer. Can't wait for
CBI-5!"

References

External links
 

2005 films
2000s Malayalam-language films
Indian sequel films
CBIDiary4
Films scored by Shyam (composer)
Indian mystery thriller films
Films with screenplays by S. N. Swamy
Central Bureau of Investigation in fiction
Films shot in Kochi
Films directed by K. Madhu
2000s mystery thriller films